Ostara may refer to:
 the  Old High German for "Easter", cognate to Anglo-Saxon Ēostre
 Spring Equinox (Ostara), the Neopagan and Wiccan festival celebrated around spring equinox
 The asteroid 343 Ostara
 The American Artemis class attack cargo ship USS Ostara (1944–1946), named after the asteroid
 Ostara (magazine), a 20th-century occult publication of Lanz von Liebenfels
 Ostara (band), a neo-folk musical group
 Ostara (album), an album by The Wishing Tree
 Ostara Publishing, a British publisher
 Ostara Nutrient Recovery Technologies Inc., a Canadian company specializing in resource recovery from wastewater and sewage sludge treatment